The Family Peace Association was inaugurated on December 2, 2017, in Seoul, South Korea, where it announced its mission: "To enlighten humanity by uplifting their spiritual consciousness through universal principles and values rooted in God-centered families." It is still in its formative stages of development.

The co-founders of the Family Peace Association are Hyun Jin Moon and Junsook Moon. Currently, Jinman Kwak is the president.

In his address at the Inaugural Ceremony, Hyun Jin Moon expressed that the Family Peace Association was created to carry on the trans-religious work his late father, Sun Myung Moon, sought to accomplish with the establishment of the Family Federation for World Peace and Unification (FFWPU). Hyun Jin Moon held a key leadership role in FFWPU from 1998 to 2008. He stated, "I can no longer work through the FFWPU because it is not true to my father’s original mission", and dedicated the Family Peace Association as the "new vehicle" to realize his father's intentions of "creating a global movement to inspire all humanity to establish God-centered families."

It was suggested that the Family Peace Association could play a leadership role in the reunification of the Korean peninsula through a focus on reuniting families divided between North and South.

Relation to the Family Federation for World Peace and Unification and Sun Myung Moon 

The Family Federation for World Peace and Unification was established in the mid-1990s by Sun Myung Moon. Sun Myung Moon stated at the founding of the FFWPU that he never intended to create a new religion, but to open an age after religion where families would serve as the core of spiritual and character growth. Sun Myung Moon has even stated that the HSA-UWC, the predecessor to FFWPU which he established in 1954, was meant to foster ecumenical cooperation among Christian sects to promote families with deep spirituality and a commitment to serving their larger society.

In 1994, Rev. Moon declared the completion of the mission of HSA-UWC aiming to dissolve the church structure, and two years later the FFWPU was launched as a new entity to advance Unification theology and principles. The FFWPU was created as a broad-based social movement to promote healthy families and strong societies. According to a memo from the HSA-UWC North America Headquarters in 1997, from the beginning it was clear that the two entities, FFWPU and HSA-UWC, were separate entities, both in objectives and legally.

Hyun Jin Moon was appointed vice-president of the Family Federation for World Peace and Unification in 1998. Hyun Jin Moon is the successor leading the Unification Movement.

References

External links
Family Peace Association (official website)

Unification Church affiliated organizations
2017 establishments in South Korea
Nontrinitarian denominations
Religious organizations based in South Korea
Christian organizations established in 2017
Family associations